Kanev is a surname of Slavic origin. It may refer to:

Ivan Kanev (born 1984), Bulgarian football player
Peycho Kanev (born 1980), Bulgarian writer
Radan Kanev (born 1975), Bulgarian politician
Tihomir Kanev (born 1986), Bulgarian football player
Yitzhak Kanev (1896–1980), Israeli political leader

See also
Kanevsky (disambiguation)
Kaniv, a city in Ukraine

Jewish surnames
Slavic-language surnames